South Carolina Highway 9 Business can refer to:

South Carolina Highway 9 Business (Bennettsville), a business loop in Bennettsville
South Carolina Highway 9 Business (Chester), a business loop in Chester
South Carolina Highway 9 Business (Chesterfield), a former business loop in Chesterfield
South Carolina Highway 9 Business (Lancaster), a business loop in Lancaster
South Carolina Highway 9 Business (Loris), a business loop in Loris

009 Business
009 Business